Nadelman is a surname. Notable people with the surname include:

Elie Nadelman (1882–1946), American sculptor, draughtsman and art collector
Stefan Nadelman (born 1972), American film director and animator

See also
Ethan Nadelmann (born 1956), American drug policy reform activist and writer
Noëmi Nadelmann (born 1962), Swiss soprano